La Michoacana may refer to:
La Michoacana Meat Market, a U.S. chain of grocery stores
Paletería La Michoacana, Mexico's largest chain of ice cream and popsicle shops